Morgan Wade (born July 13, 1983) is an American professional BMX rider from Tyler, Texas.

Early life
Wade was born in Tyler, Texas to Sally Wade, a High School Teacher, and Lee Wade, a construction foreman. Wade was homeschooled for part of his education and attended Christian Heritage School in Tyler, Texas for part of high school where he was a striker on two of the Patriots Soccer Conference Championship teams. He later attended Tyler Junior College and majored in graphic arts. Today, Morgan is a member of Sylvania Church and enjoys a successful BMX career full-time.

BMX rider
Wade competed in the 2006 and 2007 X-Games in the Freestyle and Big Air competitions. He won gold in 2013 X Games Los Angeles for Big Air BMX.

His sponsors include Gas Monkey Energy, Etnies, Levi's, Maxxis, and ODI. His signature move is the superman tailwhip, and he was the first person to successfully land the trick properly. He once appeared on the MTV show Scarred. Wade appeared in the video section of Ride BMX's Drop The Hammer, in which he looped the Mt. Baldy fullpipe. Wade gained a reputation for his toughness as he has been in some major on tour accidents, including getting teeth knocked out, but continued to perform at a high level on the tour.

Wade resides in Tyler, Texas and is married to Natalie Wade, a native of Arizona.

References

External links
 Online photo-biography 

American male cyclists
BMX riders
Sportspeople from Tyler, Texas
1983 births
Living people
X Games athletes
American Ninja Warrior contestants